The Australian College of Applied Professions (ACAP) is a registered training organisation and higher education provider that specialises in teaching Undergraduate and Postgraduate courses in psychology, counselling, social work, criminology, coaching and management. ACAP is accredited by the Psychotherapy and Counselling Federation of Australia (PACFA), the Australian Psychology Accreditation Council (APAC). 

ACAP has been in operation since 1983 and has campuses in six cities, Sydney, Melbourne, Brisbane, Perth, Adelaide and Byron Bay. It also offers courses via flexible delivery which allows students to study online. ACAP has changed its name from Australian College of Applied Psychology to Australian College of Applied Professions.

The current student population of ACAP including those studying on-campus and by flexible delivery is over 3,500. There are approximately 70 international students from a wide range of countries studying across the campuses. Students are taught by experienced academics with many also practising in the industry.

The courses offered by ACAP include:
 Associate Degree of Criminal Justice
 Bachelor of Counselling
 Bachelor of Criminology and Justice
 Bachelor of Psychological Science
 Bachelor of Psychological Science (Honours)
 Bachelor of Psychological Science and Counselling
 Bachelor of Psychological Science and Criminology
 Bachelor of Social Work
 Diploma of Counselling Skills
 Graduate Certificate in Applied Coaching
 Graduate Certificate in Human Services
 Graduate Certificate in Psychological Science
 Graduate Certificate in Wellbeing in Schools
 Graduate Diploma of Counselling
 Graduate Diploma of Legal Practice
 Graduate Diploma of Psychological Science
 Graduate Diploma of Professional Psychology Practice
 Master of Business Administration
 Master of Professional Psychology
 Master of Psychology (Clinical) 
 Master of Psychology Practice (Clinical) 
 Master of Social Work (Qualifying)
 Undergraduate Certificate in Psychological Science

External links
 

Psychology institutes
Australian tertiary institutions
Psychology organisations based in Australia